Albert Hood (August 7, 1964 – September 1994) was an American weightlifter. He competed in the men's bantamweight event at the 1984 Summer Olympics.

References

External links
 

1964 births
1994 deaths
American male weightlifters
Olympic weightlifters of the United States
Weightlifters at the 1984 Summer Olympics
Sportspeople from Los Angeles
20th-century American people